Gorbatovka is a rural locality (a village) in Razdolyevskoye Rural Settlement, Kolchuginsky District, Vladimir Oblast, Russia. The population was 14 as of 2010.

Geography 
Gorbatovka is located 24 km southeast of Kolchugino (the district's administrative centre) by road. Pavlovka is the nearest rural locality.

References 

Rural localities in Kolchuginsky District